is a river in Hokkaidō, Japan.

Course
The Niikappu River flows south to southwest from Mount Poroshiri in the Hidaka Mountains. The river flows through four dams, including Niikappu Dam and Okuniikappu Dam. Both dams are owned by the Hokkaido Electric Power Company, Inc. The dams form Lake Niikappu and Lake Poroshiri, respectively. After , the river empties into the Pacific Ocean.

References

Rivers of Hokkaido
Rivers of Japan